Padiae is a small town in the East Timor exclave of Oecussi-Ambeno. It is located inland from Lifau, on the Tono River. The town of Pasar Tono lies just to the south.

References
Wheeler, T. (2004) East Timor. Footscray, VIC: Lonely Planet.

Populated places in Oecusse